Saint Asonia is the debut studio album by rock supergroup Saint Asonia. The album was released on July 31, 2015 through RCA Records. It was released in European countries with two additional tracks on November 23, 2015.

Background
First announced via YouTube through a teaser in early May 2015, the first single "Better Place" was released on May 16, 2015. This also confirmed the group's lineup, with Adam Gontier as the frontman, Mike Mushok being the guitarist, Corey Lowery as the bassist and Rich Beddoe as the drummer. Gontier's uncle Tom Duffy provided the bass tracks for some of the songs from the album, while Lowery was hired afterward. They announced the release date and track list for the album on June 18, 2015 via Billboard. The second single, "Let Me Live My Life" was released digitally on July 17, 2015.

This is also the only studio album from the band to feature drummer Rich Beddoe before he confirmed his departure in 2017.

Critical reception

The album was received with mixed reviews. James Christopher Monger of AllMusic gave the album a 2.5 out of 5 star rating. He criticized the songs for feeling like, "cast-offs from prior projects, with recycled melodies and lyrics that sound like they were derived from an angst-centric magnetic poetry kit." However he complimented some songs such as, "Better Place," "Dying Slowly," and "Blow Me Wide Open". Ultimate Guitar said that the album is, "ready to please mainstream rock radio and guitarists alike with its brand of hard rock peppered with soulful (not kidding) ballads to boot."

The album sold 13,000 copies in its first week.

Track listing

Personnel
Credits for Saint Asonia adapted from AllMusic.

Saint Asonia
 Adam Gontier – lead vocals, rhythm guitar
 Mike Mushok – lead guitar
 Corey Lowery – bass guitar, backing vocals 
 Rich Beddoe – drums

Additional musicians
 Thomas Duffy – bass guitar 
 Johnny K – bass guitar 
 Alan Berliant – bass guitar 
 Graham Czach – bass guitar 

Production
 Johnny K – producer, engineer, mixing
 Matt Dougherty – assistant engineer, digital editing
 Bradley Cook – second assistant engineer
 Pete Murray – programming 
 Ted Jensen – mastering
 David Wolter – A&R
 Ryan Clark – art direction and design

Charts

References

2015 debut albums
Saint Asonia albums
RCA Records albums
Albums produced by Johnny K